Whatever Will Be, Will Be may refer to:

 "Que Sera, Sera (Whatever Will Be, Will Be)", a 1956 popular song recorded by Doris Day
 Whatever Will Be, Will Be (1995 film), a Hong Kong musical and drama
 Whatever Will Be, Will Be (1997 film), a Hong Kong erotic drama

See also
 Whatever Will Be, a 2005 album by Tammin
 "Whatever Will Be" (song)
Que sera (disambiguation)